Medica may refer to:

 MEDICA Group, a French company
 MEDICA Trade Fair
 Eduardo Medica, Argentinian tennis player
 Jack Medica, American swimmer
 John Medica, American sculptor and gardener
 Tommy Medica, American baseball player

See also 
 
 Medyka, a village in Poland